The Alfonso López Pumarejo Stadium is a soccer stadium of National University of Colombia located at University City of Bogotá. It is named after Alfonso López Pumarejo.

References

Sports venues completed in 1938
Football venues in Bogotá
Estadio Alfonso López Pumarejo
Sports venues in Bogotá
1938 establishments in Colombia